All the Fine Young Cannibals is a 1960 American film directed by Michael Anderson, based on the novel by Rosamond Marshall, starring Robert Wagner, Natalie Wood, Susan Kohner, George Hamilton and Pearl Bailey. Hamilton said that the film "combined Southern Gothic with a biopic of jazzman Chet Baker."

Plot
Two young people in love, musician Chad Bixby and Sarah "Salome" Davis, are forced apart despite Salome's pregnancy and marry others, but are then brought together again by chance. A downtrodden blues singer mothers Bixby while guiding his career.

Cast
Robert Wagner as Chad Bixby
Natalie Wood as Sarah "Salome" Davis
Susan Kohner as Catherine McDowall
George Hamilton as Tony McDowall
Pearl Bailey as Ruby
Jack Mullaney as Putney Tinker
Onslow Stevens as Joshua Davis
Anne Seymour as Mrs. Bixby
Virginia Gregg as Ada Davis
Mabel Albertson as Mrs. McDowall
Louise Beavers as Rose

Production
All the Fine Young Cannibals was the first film that Robert Wagner and Natalie Wood made together. George Hamilton says that director Vincente Minnelli shot some scenes when Michael Anderson was unavailable, including an ending for the film that was not used.

Wagner's character is loosely based on the jazz trumpeter Chet Baker.

Box office
According to MGM records, the film earned $950,000 in the U.S. and Canada, and $860,000 elsewhere, resulting in a loss of $1,108,000.

Influence
The film's title was the inspiration for the name of the musical group Fine Young Cannibals.

See also
 List of American films of 1960

References

External links

1960 films
1960 romantic drama films
1960s romantic musical films
American musical drama films
American romantic drama films
American romantic musical films
1960s English-language films
Films about music and musicians
Films based on American novels
Films based on romance novels
Films directed by Michael Anderson
Films set in New York City
Films set in Texas
Metro-Goldwyn-Mayer films
Cultural depictions of Chet Baker
CinemaScope films
1960s American films